Plovers are a widely distributed group of wading birds belonging to the subfamily Charadriinae.

Description
There are about 66 species in the subfamily, most of them called "plover" or "dotterel".  The closely related lapwing subfamily, Vanellinae, comprises about 20 species.

Plovers are found throughout the world, with the exception of the Sahara and the polar regions, and are characterised by relatively short bills. They hunt by sight, rather than by feel as longer-billed waders like snipes do. They feed mainly on insects, worms or other invertebrates, depending on the habitat, which are obtained by a run-and-pause technique, rather than the steady probing of some other wader groups. Plovers engage in false brooding, a type of distraction display. Examples include pretending to change position or to sit on an imaginary nest site.

Species list in taxonomic sequence
The International Ornithological Committee (IOC) recognizes these 45 species of plovers and dotterels. They are distributed among 10 genera, some of which have only one species. 

This list is presented according to the IOC taxonomic sequence and can also be sorted alphabetically by common name and binomial.

In folklore
The European golden plover spends summers in Iceland, and in Icelandic folklore, the appearance of the first plover in the country means that spring has arrived. The Icelandic media always covers the first plover sighting.

References

External links

 Plover videos, photographs & sounds on the Internet Bird Collection